Hadstock is a village in Essex, England, about  from Saffron Walden. The 2001 Census recorded a parish population of 320, increasing to 332 at the 2011 Census.

The Church of England parish church of Saint Botolph has the oldest door still in use in Great Britain. The oldest parts of the church are thought to date from about AD 1020. Since that time the church has received many additions and undergone several renovations.

On the outskirts of the village is a disused airfield that was used in World War II. While the official name for the airfield became RAF Little Walden, it was originally named after the village of Hadstock.

Hadstock has a silver band.

See also
The Hundred Parishes

References

External links

St Botolph's Church

Villages in Essex
Civil parishes in Essex
Uttlesford